The Tinkathia System or Teen Kathia System (Hindi: three Kathas), was an economic policy enforced by the East India Company in India. It was practiced largely in Eastern India and in states such as Bihar. The Tinkathia System was challenged by the Champaran Satyagraha led by Mohandas Gandhi, this in turn became a watershed moment in the Indian independence movement and it was based on that peasants had to grow indigo on the 3 parts of the land out of 20 parts. 

In other words, a farmer had to grow Indigo in 3 Katha out of 20 Katha (1 Bigha= 20 Katha). In Patna and nearby areas, 1 Katha is equals to 1,361 square feet or 151.22 square yard.

History

Background 

In the 17th and 18th century, most of Eastern India came under the rule of the East India Company. India, then, was a major producer of spices and dyes, primarily Indigo. The trade of Indigo was a major business. Several Agency Houses were involved in the Indigo trade. The East India Company compelled Indian farmers to grow cash crops like Indigo which severely affected their livelihoods.

Units of Measurement 

The term Tinkathia literally means three Kathas, which is a unit of measurement for land used in India.

In Indian units of measurement, each Bigha is subdivided into twenty Kathas. The Tinkathia System forced Indian peasants to grow only Indigo on three out of every twenty Kathas in each Bigha.

Champaran 

In his autobiography, Mohandas Gandhi described his visit to Patna and other areas of Bihar where the Tinkathia system and forced cultivation of Indigo was practiced:

The Champaran tenant was bound by law to plant three out of every twenty parts of his land with indigo for his landlord. This system was known as the tinkathia system, as three kathas out of twenty (which make one acre) had to be planted with indigo.

Legacy 

The Tinkathia System was finally abolished after the Champaran Satyagraha led by Mahatma Gandhi.

See also

 Economy of India under Company rule
 Company rule in India
 List of customary units of measurement in South Asia
 Nepalese customary units of measurement

References

External Links
 History of Tinkathia system

Economic history of India